The Centre for the Study of African Economies (CSAE) has been researching economic and social development in Africa since 1986. These days, a large team of development economists research not only countries in Africa, but also in other developing areas of the world. The CSAE is part of the Social Sciences Division at the University of Oxford, with researchers in the Department of Economics, the Blavatnik School of Government, and the Oxford Department for International Development.

About the CSAE 
The Centre aims to make a significant contribution to the transformation of African economic performance by:

 Publishing significant theoretical and empirical findings;
 Establishing itself as a focus of collaboration between researchers and policymakers;
 Engaging with policymakers and academics;
 Engaging in the training of postgraduate students.

The Centre is distinctive in a number of respects:

 Its research has required the collection of substantial amounts of primary data.
 It has sought to develop both micro and macro approaches to growth and poverty.
 Its work is collaborative between institutions across disciplines, NGOs, and international organisations.
 Its research has strong policy implications for African economies

The Centre's objective in developing these areas has been to build the research infrastructure that will allow us to pursue our primary research objective – the production of excellent research geared to an improvement in Africa’s economic performance.

The Centre produces the Journal of African Economies, published by Oxford University Press (OUP), as well as its own members' Working Paper Series.

Research 
The research undertaken at the CSAE is both microeconomic and macroeconomic. This means it looks at issues facing individuals, farmers, entrepreneurs or companies, as much as issues in relation to the overall economy such as inflation and exchange rate setting.

Centre staff participate in a wide range of activities within Africa, including data collection for both households and firms, training, and discussion with both the business and policy-making communities. The Centre also operates a programme of lunch-time seminars during term, and runs annual conferences aimed at its different user groups. Key data sets which the Centre has been responsible for collecting are also available on this web site.

Their former students are now employed throughout the world. CSAE members are available to discuss their work by phone or by e-mail.

Journal of African Economies (Oxford University Press) 
The Journal of African Economies (JAE) is a vehicle to carry rigorous economic analysis, focused entirely on Africa, for Africans and anyone interested in the continent - be they consultants, policymakers, academics, traders, financiers, development agents or aid workers.

The JAE is published by Oxford University Press (OUP), managed at the CSAE, and has an international network of Managing and Associate Editors and referees.

Instructions for those interested in submitting a paper can be found on the OUP website.

References

External links
 

Departments of the University of Oxford